"Miss Sue From Alabama" is a song sung by African American children in the South at the turn of the 20th century. The children would then dance with each other. Miss Sue was, in African American folklore, a prostitute that lured White men to bed and then manipulated them into doing favors for the Black men on the plantation. She was somewhat of a spy an undercover agent that worked on behalf of Black men.

The song was recorded in 1934 and 1939.

References

American children's songs
American folk songs
Songs about prostitutes
Songs about Alabama
Alabama in fiction